John Corcoran (June 24, 1842 - December 2, 1915) was an American soldier who received the Medal of Honor for valor during the American Civil War.

Biography
Corcoran served in the Union Army in the 1st Rhode Island Light Artillery for the Union Army. He received the Medal of Honor on November 2, 1887 for his actions at the Third Battle of Petersburg.

Medal of Honor citation
Citation:

Was one of a detachment of 20 picked artillerymen who voluntarily accompanied an infantry assaulting party, and who turned upon the enemy the guns captured in the assault.

See also

List of American Civil War Medal of Honor recipients: A-F

References

External links
Military Times

1842 births
1919 deaths
Union Army soldiers
United States Army Medal of Honor recipients
People of Rhode Island in the American Civil War
American Civil War recipients of the Medal of Honor
People from Pawtucket, Rhode Island